The XIIª Squadriglia Squadriglia MAS (Mezzi d'Assalto)   (Italian for "12th Assault Vessel Squadron")  was a formation of the Italian Royal Navy (Regia Marina) which served on Lake Ladoga as part of the Axis siege of Leningrad during World War II.

Background 
On 22 June 1941 the Axis, led by Nazi Germany, launched Operation Barbarossa, the invasion of the Soviet Union. During the summer of 1941 the Germans advanced into the USSR on three broad fronts, towards Leningrad in the north, Moscow in the centre, and Kiev in the south.

By August 1941 the German Army Group North was on the outskirts of Leningrad, having occupied the Baltic states and northwest Russia, while the Finns had advanced south into the Viipuri peninsula, leaving the city surrounded and cut off from all communication by land. The city's  only communication route was by water, over Lake Ladoga. 
To service and preserve this route, the Soviets collected a fleet of over 50 merchant vessels, protected by more than 40 escort vessels, with which they ran supply convoys to the city. Against this, the Axis had little response; their only offensive force was a single Finnish ship, the torpedo boat Sisu, which was unable to interrupt the Soviet supply route.

In order to act against this supply route, the Axis determined to build up a naval presence on the lake, and, recognizing the Regia Marina's expertise in small boat operations, requested the dispatch of a force of MAS boats to the lake. In response the RM formed the XII MAS in April 1942.

Formation

Following the request to the RM for assistance in the lake operations the RM formed the XII MAS as a section of the Decima MAS. This took place in April 1942 at La Spezia, on the Tyrrhenian Sea.
XII MAS comprised four MAS boats and their crews and support staff, a total of 99 men, under the command of Capitano di Corvetta Bianchini.

In May 1942 the force began the journey to the lake, loading the boats onto transports for the journey overland via the Brenner Pass and Innsbruck to Stettin, and by ship to Helsinki. The final leg was by road to Sortanlahti on Lake Ladoga, which served as the XII MAS's base of operations. The squadron  arrived on 22 June 1942, 12 months to the day after the opening of Barbarossa.
Already on the lake was the Finnish torpedo boat Sisu, and a German force, Naval Detachment K, composed of a number of minesweepers (KM) and armed barges (Siebel ferries). The whole force was under the overall command of Colonel E I Järvinen, of the Finnish Army.

Operational history

The XII MAS commenced operations on 25 June 1942, making reconnaissance sweeps across the lake, landing observers behind Soviet lines, and searching for submarines.
On 25 July MAS 526 was damaged in an accident, and was temporarily put out of action.

On 14 August MAS 527 and 528 intercepted  a force of three Soviet gunboats; after an exchange of fire the MAS closed in and launched torpedoes, sinking one of the gunboats.

On 27 August MAS 527 encountered a Soviet convoy consisting of two tugs pulling a train of barges, escorted by a third tug. MAS 527 shadowed this group and summoned help, and with the arrival of MAS 528 attacked with torpedoes, causing the barge train to blow up.

On 1 September MAS 529 met two Soviet gunboats while on patrol off Verkkosaari island; she engaged them by gunfire, before retiring unharmed.
On 29 September  MAS 528 and 529, commanded by Bianchini, encountered a Soviet convoy of a tug and barge train, escorted by a gunboat. They were able to manoeuvre into position to make a torpedo attack, but scored no hits.

During October the force was involved in providing support to the land forces, as winter approached, and on 30 October the lake became too frozen for operations to continue. The XII MAS was evacuated from the base at Sortanlahti, withdrawing to winter quarters in Tallinn.

The spring of 1943 saw a change in the war situation; the Regia Marina decided to transfer the XII MAS to the Mediterranean, though the four MAS boats were handed over to the Finnish navy rather than being transported back to Italy.

Aftermath

Following its 1000-mile journey to its area of operations, XII MAS served on Lake Ladoga for a 90-day period, making 59 sorties, and engaging in 17 actions, during which they sank Soviet barges, a gunboat (Bira class) and a merchant ship of 1300 tons.
Despite the skill and enthusiasm which the MAS brought to this corner of the Eastern Front, the combined operation was unable to stop Soviet efforts to maintain supply route to Leningrad, and the winter of 1942/43 saw the Sinyavino offensive and Operation Iskra, which led to an easing of the Soviet supply dilemma, though the siege was not completely lifted until January 1944.

See also
British naval expedition to Lake Tanganyika

Notes

References
 Ruge, F : The Soviets As Naval Opponents 1941-1945 (1978)  
 MAS operations on Lake Ladoga (Italian)

Military units and formations of Italy in World War II
MAS fleet